Faqihabad (also Romanized as Faqīhābād) is a village in Tameshkol Rural District, Nashta District, Tonekabon County, Mazandaran Province, Iran. At the 2006 census, its population was 1,043, in 279 families.

References 

Populated places in Tonekabon County